Secrets of Xen'drik is a supplement to the 3.5 edition of the Dungeons & Dragons role-playing game.

Contents
Secrets of Xen'drik is an accessory for the Eberron setting that explores the continent of Xen'drik, with its shattered cities and vast dungeons which hold the secrets of countless fallen empires. This book contains a comprehensive overview of Xen'drik and the gateway city of Stormreach.  It includes new feats, prestige classes, spells, equipment, and magic items.  It also provides encounters and magical locations that can be dropped into existing campaigns, as well as ready-to-play adventures, monsters, and villains.

Secrets of Xen'drik introduced the concept of encounter traps, which function more like combat encounters than normal traps, and later appeared in 
Dungeonscape in an entire chapter devoted to traps.

Publication history
Secrets of Xen'drik was written by Keith Baker, Jason M. Bulmahn, and Amber E. Scott, and published in July 2006. Cover art was by Wayne Reynolds, with interior art by Andy Brase, Mitch Cotie, Eric Deschamps, Steve Ellis, Wayne England, Jason Engle, John Hodgson, Ron Lemen, Lucio Parrillo, Mark Tedin, and Franz Vohwinkel.

Reception

Reviews
The Geek Gazette (Issue 5 - Feb 2007)

External links
product info

References

Eberron supplements
Role-playing game supplements introduced in 2006